The Hindu Temple of Florida is a Hindu temple and cultural center in Tampa, Florida.

History 
In 1983, a group of Hindu's residing in and around Tampa, Florida established the Hindu Temple of Florida, a non-profit organization. In 1989, the organization purchased land located ten miles north of the Tampa International Airport.  Construction for the temple began in 1994 and concluded in 1996. In 1996, the Maha Kumbabhishekam and the consecration of the deities was performed by priest to commemorate the opening of the temple. Following the opening, after six years of continued construction, the intricate carvings and sculptures seen on the external facing walls of the temple were completed.

Temple dimensions 
The temple is 70 feet tall and 14,573-square-feet. The rajagopuram was designed and created by Muthiah Sthapathi and artists from Chennai, India.

Temples in Tampa, FL 
Other Indian temples in Tampa, FL include:
 Ambaji Mandir of Tampa Bay
BAPS Shri Swaminarayan Mandir
Jain Temple
Sanatan Mandir
Shree Mariamman Kali Temple
Shri Radha Krishna Mandir
Shri Saraswati Devi Mandir
Vishnu Mandir

References 

Asian-American culture in Florida
Religious buildings and structures in Tampa, Florida
Hindu temples in Florida
1996 establishments in Florida
Indian-American culture in Florida
Buildings and structures in Hillsborough County, Florida